Yang Wantai (born October 1956) is a Chinese chemist and professor at Beijing University of Chemical Technology.

Biography
Yang was born in Cheng'an County, Hebei, in October 1956. After resuming the college entrance examination, he was accepted to Tsinghua University, where he majored in chemistry. He earned a master's degree from Beijing University of Chemical Technology, after his graduation he worked in the university. In April 1996 he received his doctor's degree from the KTH Royal Institute of Technology. 

He was dean of the School of Materials, Beijing University of Chemical Technology from 2005 to 2016. In 2013 he was appointed director of Beijing Laboratory of Biomedical Materials. He was elected an academician of the Chinese Academy of Sciences on November 28, 2017.

Papers

References

1956 births
Living people
People from Cheng'an County
Beijing University of Chemical Technology alumni
Academic staff of Beijing University of Chemical Technology
Chemists from Hebei
Members of the Chinese Academy of Sciences
Tsinghua University alumni